Ray "Earthquake" Jenkins (c. 1920 – ?) was an American football, track and field, and wrestling coach.  He served as the head football coach at the University of Montana from 1958 to 1963, compiling a record of 14–43.  A native of Cheraw, Colorado, Jenkins attended the University of Colorado Boulder, where he lettered in football, track and field, and wrestling.  After he was fired from his post at Montana, he worked as a scout for the San Francisco 49ers and the New Orleans Saints of the National Football League (NFL).

Head coaching record

Football

References

1920s births
Year of death missing
American football fullbacks
American male discus throwers
Colorado Buffaloes football coaches
Colorado Buffaloes football players
Colorado Buffaloes men's track and field athletes
Colorado Buffaloes wrestlers
Montana Grizzlies football coaches
New Orleans Saints scouts
San Francisco 49ers scouts
College track and field coaches in the United States
College wrestling coaches in the United States
People from Otero County, Colorado
Players of American football from Colorado
Track and field athletes from Colorado